Alguien Te Mira (Someone's Watching You) is an American Spanish-language telenovela produced by United States-based television network Telemundo. This thriller/mystery film is a remake of Chilean telenovela Alguien te mira produced by TVN in 2007.

Telemundo aired this series during the 2010–2011 season, from Monday to Friday over about 26 weeks. As with most of its other telenovelas, the network broadcasts English subtitles as closed captions on CC3. The series was filmed and set in Chicago, although some scenes were filmed in studios in Miami.

This show's jazzy, English-language recurring theme is You Still Love Me, performed by Ray Chang.

Plot 
Chicago 2005—Rodrigo Quintana, Piedad Estévez, Julián García and Benjamín Morandé are inseparable friends. Full of ideals and projects for the future, they study medicine and dream of working together to help those most in need. Rodrigo (Christian Meier) is the most intelligent and natural leader of the group. His personality conquered Piedad (Danna García) with whom he lives an intense and stormy love, while Julián (Rafael Amaya) loves her in silence. But the intensity of Quintana added to its addiction to drugs and alcohol ended up deteriorating its relationship with Piedad. To the point that disappears of their lives after a confused incident that leaves a dead person and to Piedad hospitalized. Rodrigo left his friends and his studies to go to a rehabilitation clinic outside the country.

Chicago 2010–5 years later and when Benjamín (David Chocarro) married Tatiana Wood (Géraldine Bazán), Julián and Piedad have forgotten that time, Rodrigo returns to their lives. Members of the Clinic, Chicago Advanced Clinic, the three doctors discover that the return of Rodrigo Quintana, after years of residence in Europe, continues to disturb them. Friends have changed. While Quintana opted for an austere lifestyle in a rural office, his friends have accumulated a small fortune by operating the eyes of high society. His return also causes a break in the routine of Piedad, who will discover that, despite everything, Rodrigo is still the great love of his life.

Shortly afterwards a series of murders began to occur to women and all agreed that the murdered woman was single mother and of good economic position. Some begin to suspect others. Only one of them is the real killer.

Cast

Main 
 Danna García as Piedad Estévez 
 Christian Meier as Rodrigo Quintana
 Rafael Amaya as Julián García Correa
 David Chocarro as Benjamín Morandé
 Géraldine Bazán as Tatiana Wood 
 Karla Monroig as Matilde Larraín
 Angélica Celaya as Eva Zanetti
 Rodrigo de la Rosa as Pedro Pablo Peñafiel
 Ximena Duque as Camila Wood
 Yul Bürkle as Mauricio Ostos
 Evelin Santos as Luisa Carvajal
 Diana Franco as Dolores "Lola" Morandé
 Carlos Garín as Fiscal Ángel Maldonado
 Alba Raquel Barros as Yolanda Montoya / Yoyita
 Iván Hernández as Jiménez
 Andrés Mistage as Amador Sánchez
 Cynthia Olavarria as Lucía "Lucy" Saldaña
 Roberto Gatica as Nicolás Gordon 
 Andrés Cotrino as Emilio García Larraín
 Sofía Sanabria as Amparo Zanetti
 Ariana Muniz as María Jesús Peñafiel Morandé
 Nicole Arci as María Teresa Peñafiel Morandé
 Natalie Medina as María Esperanza Peñafiel Morandé 
 Daniel Fernández as Benjamín "Benjita" Morandé
 Emily Alvarado as Isadora "Isa" Morandé
 Carolina Tejera as Valeria Stewart

Special guest stars 
 Arianna Coltellacci as Blanca Gordon
 Yami Quintero as Angela Argento
 Zuleyka Rivera as Rocío Lynch 
 Riczabeth Sobalvarro as Daniela Franco
 Héctor Soberón as Daniel Vidal
 Cristina Figarola as Fabiola Correa
 Jorge Hernández as Edward James Sandberg
 Victoria del Rosal as Amalia Vieyra

Awards and nominations

References

External links 
 

2010 telenovelas
2010 American television series debuts
2011 American television series endings
American television series based on telenovelas
RTI Producciones telenovelas
Spanish-language American telenovelas
Telemundo telenovelas
Television series by Universal Television
American television series based on Chilean television series